Humet is a surname. Notable people with the surname include:

Javier Humet (born 1990), Spanish handball player
Ramón Humet (born 1968), Spanish composer